Certified Financial Manager (CFM)  is a finance certification in financial management. The credential is earned through work experience, examination, and continuing education. The program was established by Institute of Management Accountants in June 1996, and 4,940 financial professionals earned the CFM designation. The CFM exams were discontinued December 31, 2007. 

The requirements for certification included:
passing four examinations testing economics, management, corporate finance, management accounting, https://en.m.wikipedia.org/wiki/Decision_analysis , and ethics;
two years of relevant work experience;
holding a Bachelor’s degree;
abiding by the Statement of Ethical Professional Practice. 
Once certified, the CFM was required to maintain membership in IMA and complete 30 hours of continuing education annually.

Although the CFM certification "was an excellent program", the program was unable to find a sustained audience. Therefore, the Board of Regents made the decision not to expend further resources on the CFM examination process but rather to dedicate those resources to supporting the Certified Management Accountant (CMA) program. Much of the finance material in the CFM exam was moved to the CMA curriculum. The IMA continues to support all CFM holders with appropriate member services, recognition of the CFM achievement, and the maintenance of certification records. For a listing of Active CFMs, visit: imanet.org

Chartered Financial Manager (ChFM)  is a finance certification in financial management conferred by the CHEA recognized Global Academy of Finance and Management. This financial management credential is earned through work experience, accredited college degrees, training, ethics guidelines, and continuing education.

Notes

 https://web.archive.org/web/20110726174413/http://www.imanet.org/cma_certification/CertifiedFinancialManager.aspxIMA

External links 
IMA (Institute of Management Accountants, Inc.), Retrieved 2010-10-7
Smartpros Accounting, Retrieved 2010-10-7
Eller College of Management, The University of Arizona, Retrieved 2010-10-7
Finance Certifications
Global Academy of Finance and Management

Accounting qualifications
2007 disestablishments
Professional certification in finance
Financial management